Makdee, promoted as The Web Of The Witch, in English, is a 2002 Indian comedy horror film written and directed by Vishal Bhardwaj. It stars Shabana Azmi, Makrand Deshpande, Shweta Basu Prasad and Alaap Mazgaonkar. The film tells the story of a young girl in north India and her encounter with an alleged witch in an old mansion in the locality, believed by the locals to be haunted. It also explains the belief in witches and witchcraft across modern day India. The film was screened in the Critics' Week (Spotlight on India) section at the 2003 Cannes Film Festival.

When the film society and distributors were initially unsure about the film, Shailendra Singh believed in the director and the film. Percept Pictures backed the film, giving Vishal his directorial debut in Bollywood and proving that films made for children could be successful .

Plot
Life in Chunni's village is all peace and quiet, and great fun. She fools the villagers including her parents with her impersonation of her twin sister, Munni.

In the village, there is a mansion that is said to be haunted and legend goes that a witch called Makdee (Shabana Azmi) resides there. The legend has it that whosoever wanders into the mansion, comes out as an animal. No one in the village dares to enter the mansion.

Things are going fine for Chunni until the day one of her pranks gets quite out of hand. Chunni, her sister and her friend Mughal-e-azam are constantly at the odds with the local butcher, Kallu (Makarand Deshpande). Once Kallu chases Munni, Chunni's docile twin to the mansion mistaking her for Chunni in a fit of rage. As a result of this, Munni, her docile sister, enters the mansion, where presumably the witch has turned the little girl into a hen. Chunni is hysterical when she discovers this. She runs from pillar to post to get help, but her credibility is at an all-time low and the entire village refuses to believe her, so Chunni finally enters the haunted mansion alone to search for her sister.

In the mansion she comes face to face with the witch, she pleads with the witch to let her poor little sister go, as it was no fault of hers. But the witch asks her to strike a deal. She will turn Munni back into a human only if Chunni can acquire for her hundred hens in exchange.

All of a sudden, Chunni is confronted with the biggest challenge of her life.

Chunni's school master visits the mansion but a small puppy is seen exiting the mansion and people presume the witch has turned him into a puppy. Mughal-e-azam after spotting the puppy realizes it is his pet dog that had entered the mansion and has disappeared ever since. Its then Chunni realises that all this was just a ruse. Makdee is not a witch and she does not really turn humans into animals; she merely locks them up and has some plans of her own. She is actually a con-woman who has been looking for a treasure that has been hidden in the village and so she abducts many children to dig up the place to find the treasure. She is accompanied by those two policemen who are actually helping in her plan all the way.

However, as soon as Chunni finds the treasure, the con-woman traps everyone including the policemen in an attempt to flee the village. She is confronted by Kallu who enters her mansion in looking for the children. The kids and other people beat up the policemen for their notoriety and helps Chunni to stop the con-woman. The con-woman and Kallu are engaged in a brief fight before Chunni shows up and traps the woman in a similar way that she did to all the people. The con-woman falls into her own trap and gets beaten by the children. All the people locked up are finally freed and the village finds a new hero in Chunni.

Cast

 Shweta Basu Prasad as Chunni/Munni
 Shabana Azmi as Makdee, the witch
 Makrand Deshpande as Kallu, the village butcher
 Daya Shankar Pandey as school teacher
 Aalap Mazgaonkar as Mughal-e-Azam 
 Mohini Mathur as dadi

Awards

 Shweta Basu Prasad won the Indian National Film Award for Best Child Artist for 2003 for her role in the film.
The film won the second prize at the Chicago International Children's Film Festival.

References

External links

Makdee Advertisement

2002 films
2000s Hindi-language films
Indian children's films
Films directed by Vishal Bhardwaj
Films scored by Vishal Bhardwaj
Films set in country houses
2002 directorial debut films